Mario Tomić may refer to:

Mario Tomić (musician) (born 1987), Croatian music composer
Mario Tomić (handballer) (born 1988), Croatian handball player

See also
Marko Tomić (born 1991), Serbian footballer